Jorge Rafael Massó Mustelier (born 16 February 1950) is a Cuban former footballer, born in Santiago de Cuba.

Club career
Born in Santiago de Cuba, Massó played for La Habana in the city his parents moved to 8 months after his birth.

International career
He made his international debut for Cuba in 1971 and has earned a total of 32 caps, scoring 1 goal. He represented his country in 4 FIFA World Cup qualification matches.

He competed in the 1976 Summer Olympics and in the 1980 Summer Olympics and won a bronze medal at the 1971 Pan American Games and a silver medal at the 1979 Pan American Games.

Retirement
He was given a farewell match in August 1989 and went on to live in Venezuela with his wife Norelkis.

References

1950 births
Living people
Sportspeople from Santiago de Cuba
Association football forwards
Cuban footballers
Cuba international footballers
FC Ciudad de La Habana players
Olympic footballers of Cuba
Footballers at the 1976 Summer Olympics
Footballers at the 1980 Summer Olympics
Pan American Games medalists in football
Pan American Games bronze medalists for Cuba
Pan American Games silver medalists for Cuba
Cuban expatriate sportspeople in Venezuela
Footballers at the 1971 Pan American Games
Footballers at the 1975 Pan American Games
Footballers at the 1979 Pan American Games
Footballers at the 1983 Pan American Games
Medalists at the 1971 Pan American Games
Medalists at the 1979 Pan American Games
20th-century Cuban people